Schinia subspinosae is a moth of the family Noctuidae. It is in North America, including and possibly limited to Florida.

External links
Images
Florida lepidoptera Species list

Schinia
Moths of North America
Moths described in 1996